Podocalyx is a plant genus under the family Picrodendraceae described in 1841. It is the sole genus in the subtribe Podocalycinae. There is only one known species,  Podocalyx loranthoides, a tree native to Venezuela, Colombia, Peru, and northwestern Brazil.

See also
Taxonomy of the Picrodendraceae

References

Picrodendraceae
Flora of South America
Monotypic Malpighiales genera
Taxa named by Johann Friedrich Klotzsch